The blue ringtail (Austrolestes annulosus) is an Australian damselfly. It is found on most of the continent.

Taxonomy
The blue ringtail was first described by Edmond de Sélys Longchamps in 1862.

Description
The abdomen is 3 cm long. It can easily be confused with Coenagrion lyelli or Caliagrion billinghursti, but can be differentiated through dorsal patterns. They are a thin, medium-sized damselfly with varying coloration, which depends on maturity and temperature. However most are a striking blue with minimal black markings. Females are slightly more robust than males, and have a black and white/pale blue coloration.

Distribution and habitat

It is widely distributed in most of Australia, except for the northern and north-eastern parts. It is active through September to April in still water bodies such as riverine pools, lakes and ponds, including temporary pools.

Gallery

References

 

Lestidae
Insects of Australia
Insects described in 1862